We Are the Nightmare is the third studio album by melodic death metal band Arsis. It was released April 15, 2008 via Nuclear Blast Records.

History
Recording began on the September 3, 2007 at Planet Z Studios in Massachusetts and ended on October 19. It was produced by Zeuss who has previously worked on Shadows Fall and Hatebreed albums. James Malone, the primary songwriter and founding member commented that the music is much more varied than anything they had ever written.

Track listing
All songs written by James Malone.
 "We Are the Nightmare" - 4:03
 "Shattering the Spell" - 4:04
 "Sightless Wisdom" - 3:39
 "Servants to the Night" - 4:16
 "Failing Winds of Hopeless Greed" - 3:36
 "Overthrown" - 3:45
 "Progressive Entrapment" - 4:17
 "A Feast for the Liar's Tongue" - 3:48
 "My Oath to Madness" - 3:54
 "Failure's Conquest" - 5:25

Credits

Personnel
 James Malone - vocals, lead & rhythm guitars
 Ryan Knight - lead & rhythm guitars
 Noah Martin - bass
 Darren Cesca - drums, backing vocals

Production
Chris 'Zeuss' Harris - engineering, mixing
Alan Douches - mastering
Mark Riddick - artwork, layout

Appearances

The album's title song has been featured in the game Rock Band 2 as downloadable content via the Rock Band Network store.

References

Arsis albums
2008 albums
Nuclear Blast albums